Mesoclanis is a genus of tephritid  or fruit flies in the family Tephritidae.

Species
Mesoclanis bruneata Munro, 1950
Mesoclanis campiglossina Hering, 1944
Mesoclanis cribripennis (Bezzi, 1924)
Mesoclanis dubia (Walker, 1853)
Mesoclanis hyalineata Munro, 1950
Mesoclanis magnipalpis (Bezzi, 1920)
Mesoclanis optanda Munro, 1950
Mesoclanis ovalis Munro, 1950
Mesoclanis polana (Munro, 1931)

References

Tephritinae
Tephritidae genera
Diptera of Asia
Diptera of Africa